The GWR 481 Class was a class of 20  mixed-traffic steam locomotives designed for the Great Western Railway by Joseph Armstrong and built at Swindon Works in 1869. They were similar in size to the 439 Class but differed in appearance, thanks to the flowing lines of their outside frames.

Numbering
The class was originally numbered (in order of construction): 481-490 and 1122–1131. After the 1870 locomotive stocktake, six of the locomotives in the duplicate list (1122–1127) were renumbered in to the capital list as 587-592 to replace withdrawn broad-gauge locomotives; the other four duplicates (1128–1131) replaced standard-gauge locomotives as numbers 12, 19, 20, 54.

Northern division engines
Three of the class - Nos. 12, 19 and 20, which always remained in the Northern Division - were reboilered at Wolverhampton Works under George Armstrong between 1880 and 1890. Furthermore, in 1895 No. 20 was completely renewed at Swindon, as a larger locomotive, joining the 439 Class.

Southern division engines
The remaining engines were allocated to the Southern Division, working to South Wales and Weymouth, and then between Salisbury and Bristol. All were completely renewed at Swindon in 1887–90, using very little of the original locomotives. They were now "very neat little engines"; at this time William Dean added a completely new member of the class, numbered 28. Around 1900 the renewed engines were relegated to secondary duties, and were subsequently withdrawn between 1904 and 1921.

References

0481
2-4-0 locomotives
Railway locomotives introduced in 1869
Standard gauge steam locomotives of Great Britain